We're the Millers is a 2013 American crime comedy film directed by Rawson M. Thurber and starring Jason Sudeikis, Jennifer Aniston, Emma Roberts, Will Poulter, Nick Offerman, Kathryn Hahn, Molly Quinn, and Ed Helms. The film's screenplay was written by Bob Fisher, Steve Faber, Sean Anders, and John Morris, based on a story by Fisher and Faber. The plot follows a small-time pot dealer (Sudeikis) who convinces his neighbors to help him by pretending to be his family, in order to smuggle drugs from Mexico into the United States.

The film was released on August 7, 2013, by New Line Cinema through Warner Bros. Pictures. Despite mixed reviews, it was a box office success, grossing $270 million worldwide against a $37 million budget during its theatrical run. It was nominated for four People's Choice Awards, and six MTV Movie Awards, winning two.

Plot

A low-level marijuana dealer living in Denver, David Clark, is robbed of his money and stash, some of which he owes to his drug supplier, Brad Gurdlinger. Gurdlinger forces him to smuggle marijuana from Mexico to clear his debt. Realizing that one man attempting to get through customs would be suspicious, David hires a stripper neighbor stage-named Rose, a 19-year-old runaway named Casey, and his awkward 18-year-old neighbor Kenny to pose as a bogus family called the "Millers".

When the Millers reach the compound, they find out that the amount of marijuana they are picking up is not "a smidge" as Gurdlinger had informed them, but actually two tons' worth. The Millers are stopped by a police officer, who surmises that they are carrying drugs. David pays him a bribe, and the Millers go on their way. The Millers are detained at the border, but the border agents are distracted by illegal immigrants and let the Millers go without inspecting the RV.

Because of the extra load from the marijuana on the RV, one of the radiator hoses breaks. A family called the Fitzgeralds (consisting of Don, Edie, and Melissa) whom the Millers had encountered at the border catches up to them and tows their RV to a repair shop. On the way to the shop, David learns that Don Fitzgerald is a DEA agent. Kenny develops a crush on Melissa. After Kenny reveals that he has never kissed a girl, Casey and Rose give him kissing lessons; Melissa sees them.

It turns out that Gurdlinger misled David, and that his plan is to steal the marijuana from cartel boss Pablo Chacon. The next day, when the Millers head to the shop to pick up the RV, Chacon and his henchman, One-Eye, wait for them and prepare to kill them. The Millers tell Chacon that they are not a real family and that they did not know they were stealing from him. Rose is given a chance to prove that she is a stripper by dancing, and when she gets close to Chacon, she turns a steam vent onto him. The Millers then escape in the RV, with Kenny behind the wheel. Due to Kenny's erratic driving, the RV veers off the highway. A tarantula (hidden in the fruit basket One-Eye has given them) crawls up Kenny's leg, biting his testicles.

After Kenny has a severe allergic reaction to the bite, the Millers head to the hospital. This setback further delays the delivery of the drugs, but David renegotiates with Gurdlinger for a fee of $500,000 on the condition that he arrives that night. When Kenny is finally released from the hospital, David rushes him to the RV in a wheelchair and accidentally tips him over. In the ensuing argument, David inadvertently reveals how much he is getting paid, in comparison to how little he offered to pay each of the others. Casey, Rose, and Kenny are disgusted by the revelation, and David leaves them at the local carnival. After a young man named Scottie P gets fresh with Casey, Rose knocks him down.

Shortly after leaving, David regrets abandoning his companions and returns, begging them to come back with him. They agree to do so. On their way to the RV, One-Eye discovers them and is about to shoot them, but Don comes out of his camper and subdues him. Chacon then comes around the corner with Melissa held at gunpoint and is about to kill them all, but is momentarily distracted by the 4th of July fireworks. David and Kenny subdue him. David kisses Rose, and Kenny kisses Melissa. Don arrests Chacon, but lets the Millers leave.

When David delivers the drugs to Gurdlinger, who reveals he was never going to pay him, DEA agents arrest Gurdlinger. The agent in charge is Don, who tells David that he will have to remain in witness protection until the trial of Gurdlinger and Chacon. He then adds that anyone that was a witness to the crime will be in protection as well. The Millers are then seen together at a suburban house happily living together as a found family where several marijuana plants are growing in the garden.

Cast

Production
Development of the movie first began in 2002. Steve Buscemi, Will Arnett, and Jason Bateman were all attached at one point to play David Clark, and Peter Cattaneo had signed on to direct at one point. Burr Steers and eventual rewriters Sean Anders and John Morris were considered to direct. In April 2012, various sources broke the news that Jennifer Aniston and Jason Sudeikis were in talks to star in the film. Emma Roberts, Will Poulter, Ed Helms and Kathryn Hahn were added in July.

Production began in Wilmington, North Carolina, on July 23, 2012. Filming also took place in New Mexico. It was presented during the 2013 Traverse City Film Festival.

Release
The film was released in theaters on August 7, 2013, in the United States, and on August 23, 2013, in the United Kingdom. It was released on September 18, 2013, in France, and was released on November 8, 2013, in Spain.

Home media
We're the Millers was released on Blu-ray and DVD on November 19, 2013, by Warner Home Video. The DVD was released as a two-disc special edition, containing two versions of the film: the original theatrical version, and the "unrated" extended cut with 8 minutes of new material and 45 minutes of featurettes, outtakes and deleted scenes.

Reception

Box office
We're the Millers grossed over seven times its $37 million budget, earning over $150 million in North America and $119 million internationally for a worldwide total of $270 million.

Critical response
On Rotten Tomatoes, the film has an approval rating of 49% based on 160 reviews with an average rating of 5.5/10. The site's critical consensus reads, "We're the Millers squanders its potential with an uneven, lazily assembled story." On Metacritic, the film has a score of 44 out of 100 based on 38 critics, indicating "mixed or average reviews". Audiences polled by CinemaScore gave the film an average grade of "A−" on an A+ to F scale.

Accolades

Possible sequel
On February 25, 2014, Warner Bros. Pictures and New Line Cinema announced that a sequel to We're the Millers was in development, titled We're Still the Millers, with Adam Sztykiel writing the script. As of 2023, there have still been no updates on the possible sequel.

References

External links

 
 
 
 
 

2010s comedy road movies
2010s crime comedy films
2013 comedy films
2013 films
American black comedy films
American comedy road movies
American crime comedy films
American films about cannabis
Fictional quartets
Films about dysfunctional families
Films about Mexican drug cartels
Films about witness protection
Films directed by Rawson Marshall Thurber
Films produced by Vincent Newman
Films scored by Ludwig Göransson
Films scored by Theodore Shapiro
Films set in Denver
Films set in Mexico
Films shot in New Mexico
Films shot in North Carolina
Films with screenplays by John Morris
Films with screenplays by Sean Anders
Heyday Films films
New Line Cinema films
Stoner crime films
Warner Bros. films
2010s English-language films
2010s American films
2010s Mexican films
English-language crime comedy films